Eastleigh by-election may refer to:

1994 Eastleigh by-election
2013 Eastleigh by-election